Mobile Suit Zeta Gundam is a 1985 Japanese science fiction anime television series created and directed by Yoshiyuki Tomino and produced by Nagoya Broadcasting Network, Sotsu Agency, and Sunrise. Mobile Suit Zeta Gundam is the sequel to the 1979 Japanese science fiction series Mobile Suit Gundam. The series premiered in Japan on Nagoya Broadcasting Network on March 2, 1985, and spanned 50 episodes to February 22, 1986. The English adaptation was released direct to DVD in the United States.

Three pieces of theme music are used over the course of the series—two opening themes and one closing theme. Songs composed by Neil Sedaka were adapted for the series Mobile Suit Zeta Gundam. These included the two opening themes "Zeta - Toki wo Koete" (originally in English as "Better Days are Coming") and "Mizu no Hoshi e Ai wo Komete" (originally in English as "For Us to Decide", but the English version was never recorded), as well as the end theme "Hoshizora no Believe" (written as "Bad and Beautiful"). Due to copyright, the songs were replaced for the North American DVD.

Episode list

Notes

Mobile Suit Zeta Gundam
Zeta